was a Japanese professional footballer who played as a central defender for the Japan national team.

Club career
Matsuda was born in Kiryu on 14 March 1977. After graduating from high school, he joined Yokohama Marinos (later Yokohama F. Marinos) in 1995. From first season, he became a regular player and played as right back of three defence with Japan national team players Masami Ihara and Norio Omura. The club won the champions in 1995 J1 League. In 2000s, he mainly played as centre back with Yuji Nakazawa or Yuzo Kurihara, also played defensive midfielder. The club won the champions 2001 J.League Cup, 2003 and 2004 J1 League. Although he played as central player of Marinos in 16 seasons, he was sacked end of 2010 season.

Matsuda moved to Japan Football League club Matsumoto Yamaga FC in 2011. Although he played for qualify for promote to J2 League, in 2 August, he collapsed for myocardial infarction during training. On 4 August, he died at the age of 34. His last match against Honda on 23 July was his 400th game in the league. At the end of the season, the club won promotion to the J2 League.

International career
In August 1993, Matsuda was selected Japan U-17 national team for 1993 U-17 World Championship. He played full-time in all 4 matches and scored 1 goal. In April 1995, he was also selected Japan U-20 national team for 1995 World Youth Championship and he played full-time in all 4 matches.

In July 1996, Matsuda was selected Japan U-23 national team for 1996 Summer Olympics and he played full-time in all 3 matches. Although Japan won 2 matches, Japan lost at First round. At this time, Japan won Brazil in first game. It was known as "Miracle of Miami" (マイアミの奇跡) in Japan.

On 5 February 2000, Matsuda debuted for Japan national team against Mexico. After the debut, he played many matches as one of three backs defense. In September, he was selected U-23 Japan for 2000 Summer Olympics 2nd time. However he played only 2 matches instead Koji Nakata got injured in the third game.

In October 2000, Matsuda was selected Japan for 2000 Asian Cup. He played 3 matches and Japan won the champions. In 2001, he was also selected Japan for 2001 Confederations Cup. He played 4 matches and Japan won the 2nd place. At 2002 World Cup, he played full-time in all 4 matches. After 2002 World Cup, he did not play in many matches. He was selected Japan for 2004 Asian Cup. Although Japan won the champions, he played only 5 minutes. On 29 January 2005, he played and scored a goal against Kazakhstan. Although this goal is his first goal for Japan, this game became his last game for Japan. He played 40 games and scored 1 goal for Japan until 2005.

Death
On 2 August, Matsuda collapsed during training with Matsumoto Yamaga FC due to a cardiac arrest after finishing a 15-minute warmup run, and doctors diagnosed his condition as "extremely severe". Two days later, he died at the age of 34.

Despite releasing him in 2010, his former club Yokohama F. Marinos retired his squad number 3 after his death, as an indication of his contribution not only to F. Marinos but to Japan football's development, both at league and international levels.

The funeral was held on 9 August 2011 and attendees included players who once played for Japan and Yokohama F. Marinos.

Career statistics

Club

International

Scores and results list Japan's goal tally first, score column indicates score after each Matsuda goal.

Honours
Yokohama F. Marinos
J1 League: 1995, 2003, 2004
J.League Cup: 2001

Japan
FIFA Confederations Cup: Runner-up 2001
AFC Asian Cup: 2000, 2004

Individual
J.League Best XI: 2000, 2002
J.League 20th Anniversary Team

References

External links
 
 
 Japan National Football Team Database
 
 Yokohama F. Marinos profile 

1977 births
2011 deaths
Association football people from Gunma Prefecture
Japanese footballers
Japan youth international footballers
Japan international footballers
J1 League players
Japan Football League players
Yokohama F. Marinos players
Matsumoto Yamaga FC players
2001 FIFA Confederations Cup players
2002 FIFA World Cup players
2000 AFC Asian Cup players
2004 AFC Asian Cup players
AFC Asian Cup-winning players
Olympic footballers of Japan
Footballers at the 1996 Summer Olympics
Footballers at the 2000 Summer Olympics
Association football defenders
Association football players who died while playing
Sport deaths in Japan